The North American Qualification Tournament for the 2004 Men's Olympic Volleyball Tournament was held in Caguas, Puerto Rico from 4 to 10 January 2004.

Venue
 Coliseo Héctor Solá Bezares, Caguas, Puerto Rico

Preliminary round

|}

|}

Final round

Semifinals

|}

3rd place match

|}

Final

|}

Final standing
{| class="wikitable" style="text-align:center;"
|-
!width=40|Rank
!width=180|Team
|- bgcolor=#ccffcc
|1
|style="text-align:left;"|
|- bgcolor=#dfefff
|2
|style="text-align:left;"|
|- bgcolor=#dfefff
|3
|style="text-align:left;"|
|-
|4
|style="text-align:left;"|
|-
|5
|style="text-align:left;"|
|}

External links
Results at FIVB.org

Volleyball Men North America
Olympic Qualification Men North America